Beni Badibanga (born 19 February 1996) is a Belgian footballer who plays as a winger.

Club career
Badibanga is a youth exponent from Standard Liège. At 25 July 2015, he made his senior debut against KV Kortrijk in a league game. He replaced Faysel Kasmi after 82 minutes in a 2–1 away defeat.

International career
He was capped by Belgium at Under 19s and at Under 21s Level.

He has played for the DR Congo Under 20s team.

He was called up by the DR Congo national team for the African Cup of Nations 2021 Qualifiers.

Personal life
Beni's father was the Prime Minister of the Democratic Republic of the Congo, Samy Badibanga.

References

External links

1996 births
Living people
Association football wingers
Belgian footballers
Belgium under-21 international footballers
Belgium youth international footballers
Belgian sportspeople of Democratic Republic of the Congo descent
Standard Liège players
Raja CA players
Roda JC Kerkrade players
Lierse S.K. players
S.K. Beveren players
Royal Excel Mouscron players
Belgian Pro League players
Eredivisie players
Belgian expatriate footballers
Expatriate footballers in the Netherlands